A Mighty River of Song was a unique concert performance by various members of the Waterson family on 12 May 2007 at the Royal Albert Hall in the South Kensington area of London, England.

The concert was intended to celebrate the fortieth anniversary of the original Watersons playing the same venue shortly prior to disbanding in the late 1960s. Performers at the concert included various former members of 'The Watersons', current and former members of Waterson–Carthy and a number of other Waterson family members. The concert also included a short performance by Brass Monkey which was intended to re-launch the band after the death of their founder member Howard Evans in 2006. Eliza Carthy also accompanied the traditional Yorkshire long sword team the Goathland Plough Stots in the performance of two dances. During the course of the evening Eliza Carthy was presented with the prestigious Gold Badge of the English Folk Dance and Song Society.

The concert was promoted by the Derbyshire based arts consultants and event organisers Mrs Casey Music.

Performers
The Waterson Family:
 Davoc Brady
 Eleanor Waterson
 Rachel Straw
 Anne Waterson
 Tim Van Eyken
 Martin Carthy
 Norma Waterson
 Mike Waterson
 Maria Gilhooley
 Eliza Carthy
 Saul Rose
 Oliver Knight

Brass Monkey:
 Martin Carthy
 John Kirkpatrick
 Roger Williams
 Martin Brinsford

The Goathland Plough Stots:
 Characters: Keith Thompson, Malcolm Worley & Les Atkinson
 Dancers: Jack Atkinson, David Atkinson, Daniel Atkinson, Allan Davies, Ian Davies & John Atkinson
 Musicians: Eliza Carthy, Steve Peirson, Andrew Smith & Sally Atkinson
 Plough Boys: Elliot Mayes, Kyle Skelton, Alexander & Mikey Simmonds

External links
 Waterson–Carthy official website - now redirects to a gaming site
 The Goathland Plough Stots official website
 English Folk Dance and Song Society
 Mrs Casey Music

Concerts in the United Kingdom